Robert Good may refer to:

 Robert A. Good (1922–2003), American physician 
 Robert C. Good (died 1984), president of Denison University and American ambassador to Zambia
 Robert G. Good (born 1965), United States Representative from Virginia